Collins Sikombe (born 19 June 1997) is a Zambian footballer who plays as a midfielder for NAPSA Stars and the Zambia national football team.

Career

Club
In 2018, Sikombe was the subject of a dispute between NAPSA Stars and Lusaka Dynamos, in which NAPSA attempted to recall Sikombe from a loan Lusaka Dynamos claimed he wasn't on, arguing they had purchased him.

International
Sikombe made his senior international debut on 4 June 2017 in a 0-0 friendly draw with Gabon.

Career statistics

International

International goals
Scores and results list Zambia's goal tally first.

References

External links
Collins Sikombe at EuroSport

1997 births
Living people
Lusaka Dynamos F.C. players
NAPSA Stars F.C. players
Zambia Super League players
Zambian footballers
Zambia international footballers
Association football midfielders
Sportspeople from Lusaka
Zambia A' international footballers
2020 African Nations Championship players